The Kylshakty (Qylşaqty) is a river in Northern Kazakhstan that flows through the Akmola Region in Central Kazakhstan.

Geography 
The river starts in the Kokshetau Massif, part of the Kokshetau Hills, in a birch forest on Semenov's Hill's western slope, flows west through Shchuchinsk, and bends north toward Frolovsky Pond before bending to the northwest. It crosses Bayanbai and passes two dams before it reaches Kenesary. The river is 246 kilometers away from Kazakhstan's capital, Astana.

References 

Rivers of Kazakhstan
Rivers of Akmola Region
North Kazakhstan Region